Tooth Fairy is a 2010 fantasy comedy family film directed by Michael Lembeck, produced by Jim Piddock, Jason Blum, Mark Ciardi and Gordon Gray, written by Lowell Ganz, Babaloo Mandel, Randi Mayem Singer, Joshua Sternin and Jennifer Ventimilia with music by George S. Clinton and starring Dwayne Johnson, Ashley Judd, and Julie Andrews.

Filmed in Vancouver, British Columbia, it was co-produced by Walden Media and distributed and theatrically released by 20th Century Fox on January 22, 2010. The movie was given a negative reception from critics but it earned $112.5 million on a $48 million budget, making it a success at the box office. Tooth Fairy was released on DVD and Blu-ray Disc/DVD/digital copy combination pack on May 4, 2010. A direct-to-video sequel, Tooth Fairy 2, starred Larry the Cable Guy as the title character and was released on March 6, 2012.

Plot
Derek Thompson is a minor league ice hockey player, nicknamed the "Tooth Fairy" for his habit of knocking opposing players' teeth out. One night, Derek steals a dollar from his girlfriend Carly's six-year-old daughter Tess that had been left for her lost tooth, and tells her that the tooth fairy doesn't exist. He receives a magical Summons under his pillow, which causes him to grow wings and transports him to the realm of tooth fairies. He meets his caseworker, Tracy, and the head fairy, Lily. He has an adversarial relationship with them. Lily tells Derek that he is a "dream crusher," due to his unsympathetic dealings with children like Tess. He is sentenced to serve two weeks as a tooth fairy. Later, he meets Jerry, who gives him his tooth fairy supplies, which include "Shrinking Paste," "Invisible Spray,"  "dog peppermints "Amnesia Dust", "cat away" and a magic wand that will only work if he believes.

Carly's 14-year-old son, Randy, dislikes Derek. Randy wants to grow up to be a heavy metal star. When Derek defends Randy against a bully, he begins to win Randy over, and Derek begins teaching Randy to play his electric guitar better so he can win a talent show.

Derek visits several children and tries to collect teeth and give out dollars, but what with cats, waking children and being 'called' in the middle of a hockey match leading to his shrinking himself and jumping in a toilet to escape, he is not doing very well at it. Lily says that he is the worst tooth fairy ever and denies Derek any more supplies from Jerry for the remainder of his sentence, criticizing his lack of faith in children. Afterward, he is approached by a fairy named Ziggy who provides him black market supplies. Later that night, the items malfunction and Derek is seen by a child's mother and arrested. While behind bars, Tracy tells Derek that Lily extended his duty to three weeks. However, he offers to give Derek proper supplies if he will start acting like a tooth fairy. Carly bails Derek out.

Derek works on improving his tooth fairy skills and bonding with Tracy and Randy, but when Derek can't score a goal at a hockey game, he takes his frustration out on Randy, telling him that he will never become a rock star. With his dreams crushed, Randy tearfully smashes his guitar and a disappointed Carly breaks up with Derek, telling him his biggest flaws are his inability to be optimistic and that he can't say "what if".

Later, Tracy comes to Derek's house, much to Derek's annoyance. He announces that he is a tooth fairy-in-training, but that Derek's dream crushing reputation hurts himself more than others as Derek orders him to get out of his house. At the next hockey game, Derek gets back on the ice and sees Tracy. Tracy wants to teach Derek the importance of dreams, encouraging Derek to score a goal and go get Tess' tooth. With a renewed spirit, Derek scores the goal, gets into his tooth fairy costume, and flies away, while Tracy spreads Amnesia Dust on the audience to cover up the event.

At Carly's, Tess sees Derek taking her tooth, but she promises to keep it a secret. Derek apologizes to Randy and encourages him to keep pursuing his dreams, using his magic wand to grant Randy a new guitar. Downstairs, Carly sees Derek as a tooth fairy, but assumes that he rented a costume for Tess' sake, causing her to forgive him. Derek flies Randy to the talent show throwing Amnesia Dust on him when they arrive.

Derek heads back to the fairy realm to give Lily the tooth, and is told that because of this job, as well as for reaffirming Tess' belief, he has been relieved of his fairy duties. Lily explains that he will never see the tooth fairies again and will have Amnesia Dust thrown on him. Before departing, Derek says a friendly goodbye to Tracy. Lily throws Amnesia Dust on Derek and transports him back to the talent show. There, Randy outperforms everyone and ends up forming a band. Derek proposes to Carly, and she accepts.

Ultimately, Derek is seen playing left wing for the Los Angeles Kings, and when he sees Lily and Jerry in the crowd, he doesn't recognize them. Jerry secretly helps him score a goal.

Cast

 Dwayne Johnson as Derek Thompson, a hockey player forced to become a Tooth Fairy as punishment for being a "dream crusher".
 Ashley Judd as Carly Harris, Derek's girlfriend.
 Julie Andrews as Lily, the head of the Tooth Fairies.
 Stephen Merchant as Tracy, a wingless tooth fairy assigned to be Derek's case manager.
 Chase Ellison as Randy Harris, Carly's fourteen-year-old son and Tess' older brother who loves electric guitar.
 Destiny Whitlock as Tess Harris, Carly's six-year-old daughter.
 Ryan Sheckler as Mick "the Stick" Donnelly, Derek's new teammate, a highly talented, but disrespectful young hockey player.
 Brendan Meyer as Ben, Randy's classmate who verbally attacks him.
 Billy Crystal as Jerry, a fairy working for Lily who provides Derek his tooth fairy supplies.
 Seth MacFarlane as Ziggy, a fairy that sells black market tooth fairy items.
 Brandon T. Jackson as Duke
 Josh Emerson as Kyle Padgett
 Dan Joffre as the Tooth Fairy #1
 Dana Jaime as the Permit Woman
 Desiree Crosthwaith as The Hockey Team Coach
 Michael Daingerfield as The Hockey Game Broadcast Announcer
 Chad Brownlee as unnamed hockey player

Production
The hockey scenes were filmed at the Great Western Forum using players from the Los Angeles Kings. The score for Tooth Fairy was composed by George S. Clinton and recorded in the spring of 2009 with an 80-piece ensemble of the Hollywood Studio Symphony at the Newman Scoring Stage at 20th Century Fox studios.

Reception

Box office
The film was released on January 22, 2010, and opened in 3,344 theaters and took in $3,544,512 its opening day, with an average of $1,060 per theater. On its opening weekend, it grossed $14,010,409 with an average of $4,190 per theater. It ranked #4, behind Avatar, Legion, and The Book of Eli; however, the film rose to #3 on that weekend in Canada with $16,000,000 and remained #4 in the U.S. on its second weekend, behind Avatar, Edge of Darkness, and When in Rome. Despite negative reviews, the film has come to be a box office hit grossing $60,022,256 in the United States and Canada, and $51,854,764 in other markets, grossing a worldwide total of $111,877,020.

Critical response
On Rotten Tomatoes, the film has an approval rating of 17% based on 116 reviews with an average rating of 4/10. The site's critical consensus reads, "Dwayne Johnson brings the full force of his charm (and his appropriately pale chompers) to the title role, but flat direction and a committee-written script render The Tooth Fairy unacceptably dull." On Metacritic, the film has a score of 36 out of 100 based on 24 critics, indicating "generally unfavorable reviews". Audiences polled by CinemaScore gave the film an average grade of "A−" on an A+ to F scale.

Home media

Tooth Fairy was released on DVD and Blu-ray Disc/DVD/Digital copy combination pack on May 4, 2010.

Sequel
Tooth Fairy was followed by a sequel, starring Larry the Cable Guy as the title character. Directed by Alex Zamm, Tooth Fairy 2 had a direct-to-video release on March 6, 2012.

See also
List of films featuring miniature people

References

External links

 
 
 
 
 

2010 films
2010s fantasy comedy films
2010s sports comedy films
20th Century Fox films
American fantasy comedy films
American sports comedy films
Blumhouse Productions films
Canadian sports comedy films
Canadian fantasy comedy films
English-language Canadian films
Canadian ice hockey films
Dune Entertainment films
2010s English-language films
Fiction about size change
Films directed by Michael Lembeck
Films produced by Jason Blum
Films shot in British Columbia
Films with screenplays by Babaloo Mandel
Films with screenplays by Lowell Ganz
Films scored by George S. Clinton
Walden Media films
2010 comedy films
20th Century Studios franchises
2010s Canadian films
2010s American films
Films about tooth fairies